Longnan railway station serves Longnan County in the city of Ganzhou in Jiangxi province, China. Six trains pass through the station every day.

References

Railway stations in Jiangxi
Stations on the Beijing–Kowloon Railway